Gharghan (also Romanized as Gharghen) is a village in Varzaq-e Jonubi Rural District, in the Central District of Faridan County, Isfahan Province, Iran. At the 2006 census, its population was 710, in 181 families.

References 

Populated places in Faridan County